The Old Folks at Home is a 1916 American drama silent black and white film directed by Chester Withey. It is based on the story by Rupert Hughes.

Cast
 Sir Herbert Beerbohm Tree as John Coburn
 Josephine Crowell as Mrs. Coburn
 Elmer Clifton as Steve Coburn
 Mildred Harris as Marjorie
 Lucille Young as Lucia Medina
 W.E. Lawrence as Stanley
 Spottiswoode Aitken as Judge
 Alfred Paget
 Wilbur Higby
 Charles Lee

References

External links
 

1916 drama films
1916 films
Triangle Film Corporation films
American black-and-white films
Films directed by Chester Withey
Films based on works by Rupert Hughes
1910s American films